Bendlowes is a surname. Notable people with the surname include:

Edward Bendlowes or Edward Benlowes (1603–1676), English poet
William Bendlowes (1516–1584), English sergeant-at-law, governor of Lincoln's Inn, Member of Parliament